The Enping financial crisis occurred in Enping, Jiangmen, Guangdong in China after nationwide bank runs in the aftermath of the 1997 Asian financial crisis  brought a pattern of fraud to light in multiple of the city's banks.

Fraud
Local officials, as well as the bank managers at the local China Construction Bank (CCB) branch, had illegally allocated funds to their own projects. Other banks involved included the other three of the "big four" Chinese banks: the Bank of China, the Industrial and Commercial Bank of China, and the Agricultural Bank of China.

Aftermath
Losses incurred by the scandal cost the People's Bank of China (PBOC) RMB 6.8b. As banks pulled out of Enping, residents were denied access to financial services into the early 2010s.

References

Enping
Jiangmen
Guangdong
Financial crises